Romeville is an unincorporated community and census-designated place in St. James Parish, Louisiana, United States. Its population was 130 as of the 2010 census. The community is located along Louisiana Highway 44 on the east bank of the Mississippi River.

Geography

Demographics

References

Unincorporated communities in St. James Parish, Louisiana
Unincorporated communities in Louisiana
Census-designated places in St. James Parish, Louisiana
Census-designated places in Louisiana